The AACTA Award for Best Television Drama Series is a television award handed out by the Australian Academy of Cinema and Television Arts (AACTA). It was previously awarded by the Australian Film Institute (AFI), from 1991 to 2010, and will continue to be presented by the Academy. It is awarded to a dramatic television series of no fewer than five episodes.  It can be a series of self-contained stories which can be screened in any order or a number of interweaving and overlapping plots continuing from one episode to the next.

Between 1991 and 2001, only individual episodes were awarded. The award has changed its name several times, and between 1993 and 2001, it became two separate categories; from 1991 to 1992, the award was called Best Episode in a Television Drama, Series or Serial; from 1993 to 2001 the award was split into Best Episode in a Television Drama Series and Best Episode in a Television Drama Serial and; from 1998 to 2001 Best Episode in a Drama Serial was changed to Best Episode in a Television Drama Series (Long). In 2002 the awards was combined to make Best Drama Series.

The award is usually presented to the producer(s) of a series, but between 1991 and 2001, the award went to the producer of a specific episode. Over the years, ABC have won sixteen of twenty-nine awards. Home and Away have won four awards, more than any other television programme. If the Best Episode categories aren't taken into account, then Home and Away's wins are discounted and Love My Way would have the record of three.

Rules
Potential nominees must submit two episodes from a drama series, which will be judged as a single entry, and a fee of A$1,125. The television program must be produced and broadcast in Australia for free-to-air or subscription television channels, but excludes broadcasts on community television.

Winners and nominees

Best Episode in a Television Drama Series or Serial (1991-1992)

Best Episode in a Television Drama Series (1993-2001)

Best Episode in a Television Drama Serial (1993-2001)

Best Television Drama Series (2002-current)
{| class="wikitable" style="width:100%"
|- bgcolor="#FAEB86"
! width="8%" | Year
! width="19%" | Program
! width="9%" | Network
! width="29%" | Producer(s)
|-
| rowspan=5 style="text-align:center" | 2002(45th)
|- style="background:#FAEB86"
| Kath & Kim (series 1)
| ABC
| Mark Ruse
|-
| All Saints (season 5)
| Seven Network
| Di Drew
|-
| MDA (series 1)
| ABC
| Greg Haddrick
|-
| The Secret Life of Us 
| Network Ten
| John Edwards and Amanda Higgs
|-
| rowspan=5 style="text-align:center" | 2003(46th)
|- style="background:#FAEB86"
| MDA (series 2)
| ABC
| Denny Lawrence
|-
| Grass Roots (series 2)
| ABC
| John Eastway
|-
| Stingers (series 6)
| Nine Network
| Roger Le Mesurier, Roger Simpson and John Wild
|-
| The Secret Life of Us (series 3)
| Network Ten
| Amanda Higgs
|-
| rowspan=5 style="text-align:center" | 2004(47th)
|- style="background:#FAEB86"
| Stingers (series 8)
| Nine Network
| Roger Le Mesurier, Roger Simpson and John Wild
|-
| McLeod's Daughters (season 4)
| Nine Network
| Susan Bower and Posie Graeme-Evans
|-
| MDA
| ABC
| Denny Lawrence
|-
| White Collar Blue (series 2)
| Network Ten
| Steve Knapman and Kris Wyld
|-
| rowspan=5 style="text-align:center" | 2005(48th)
|- style="background:#FAEB86"
| Love My Way (series 1)
| Fox8
| John Edwards and Claudia Karvan
|-
| All Saints (season 8)
| Seven Network
| Maryanne Carroll
|-
| Blue Heelers (season 12)
| Seven Network
| Gus Howard and David Clarke
|-
| MDA (series 3)
| ABC
| Denny Lawrence
|-
| rowspan=5 style="text-align:center" | 2006(49th)
|- style="background:#FAEB86"
| Love My Way (series 2)
| W
| John Edwards, Claudia Karvan and Jacquelin Perske
|-
| All Saints (season 9)
| Seven Network
| MaryAnne Carroll
|-
| Blue Heelers (season 13)
| Seven Network
| Gus Howard and David Clarke
|-
| McLeod's Daughters (season 6)
| Nine Network
| Posie Graeme-Evans and Karl Zwicky
|-
| rowspan=4 style="text-align:center" | 2007(50th)
|- style="background:#FAEB86"
| Love My Way (series 3)
| Showtime
| John Edwards and Claudia Karvan
|-
| All Saints (season 10)
| Seven Network
| MaryAnne Carroll and Bill Hughes
|-
| Dangerous
| Fox8
| John Edwards and Imogen Banks
|-
| rowspan=5 style="text-align:center" | 2008(51st)
|- style="background:#FAEB86"
| Underbelly 
| Nine Network
| Greg Haddrick and Brenda Pam
|-
| City Homicide (series 2)
| Seven Network
| MaryAnne Carroll
|-
| Rush (series 1)
| Network Ten
| John Edwards and Mimi Butler
|-
| Satisfaction (series 1)
| Showcase
| Andrew Walker and Roger Simpson
|-
| rowspan=5 style="text-align:center" | 2009(52nd)
|- style="background:#FAEB86"
| East West 101 (season 2)
| SBS One
| Kristine Wyld and Steve Knapman
|-
| Packed to the Rafters (season 1)
| Seven Network
| Jo Porter
|-
| Satisfaction (season 2)
| Showcase
| John Edwards and Mimi Butler
|-
| Underbelly: A Tale of Two Cities
| Nine Network
| Greg Haddrick and Brenda Pam
|-
| rowspan=5 style="text-align:center" | 2010(53rd)
|- style="background:#FAEB86"
| Rush (series 3)
| Network Ten
| John Edwards and Mimi Butler
|-
| The Circuit (season 2)
| SBS
| Ross Hutchens and Colin South
|-
| Spirited (series 1)
| W
| John Edwards, Claudia Karvan and Jacquelin Perske
|-
| Tangle (season 2)
| Showcase
| John Edwards and Imogen Banks
|-
| rowspan=5 style="text-align:center" | 2011(1st)
|- style="background:#FAEB86"
| East West 101 (season 3)
| SBS One
| Steve Knapman and Kris Wyld
|-
| Offspring (season 2)
| Network Ten
| John Edwards and Imogen Banks
|-
| Rake
| ABC1
| Ian ColliePeter Duncan and Richard Roxburgh
|-
| Spirited (series 2)
| W
| Claudia Karvan and Jacquelin Perske
|-
| rowspan=5 style="text-align:center" | 2012(2nd)
|- style="background:#FAEB86"
| Puberty Blues
| Network Ten
| John Edwards and Imogen Banks
|-
| Rake (season 2)
| ABC1
| Ian Collie, Peter Duncan and Richard Roxburgh
|-
| Redfern Now
| ABC1
| Darren Dale and Miranda Dear
|-
| Tangle (season 3)
| Showcase
| John Edwards and Imogen Banks
|-
| rowspan=5 style="text-align:center" | 2013(3rd)
|- style="background:#FAEB86"
| Redfern Now (series 2)
|  ABC1| Darren Dale and Miranda Dear|-
| Offspring (season 4)
| Network Ten
| John Edwards and Imogen Banks
|-
| Serangoon Road
| ABC1
| Paul Barron and Nick North
|-
| Wentworth (series 1)
| Soho
| Jo Porter and Amanda Crittenden
|-
| rowspan=5 style="text-align:center" | 2014(4th)
|-  style="background:#FAEB86"
| The Code| ABC| Shelley Birse, David Maher and David Taylor|-
| Janet King
| ABC
| Karl Zwicky and Lisa Scott
|-
| Puberty Blues (season 2)
| Network Ten
| John Edwards and Imogen Banks
|-
| Rake (series 3)
| ABC
| Ian Collie, Peter Duncan and Richard Roxburgh
|-
| rowspan=5 style="text-align:center" | 2015(5th)
|-  style="background:#FAEB86"
| Glitch| ABC| Tony Ayres, Louise Fox and Ewan Burnett|-
| Love Child (season 2)
| Nine Network
| Tom Hoffie
|-
| Miss Fisher's Murder Mysteries (series 3)
| ABC
| Deb Cox and Fiona Eagger
|-
| Wentworth (season 3)
| SoHo
| Jo Porter and Amanda Crittenden
|-
| rowspan=5 style="text-align:center" | 2016(6th)
|- style="background:#FAEB86"
| Wentworth (season 4)| SoHo| Pino Amenta and Jo Porter|-
| The Code
| ABC
| David Maher, David Taylor, Shelley Birse, Diane Haddon
|-
| Jack Irish
| ABC
| Ian Collie, Andrew Knight
|-
| Rake
| ABC
| Ian Collie, Peter Duncan, Richard Roxburgh
|-
| rowspan=6 style="text-align:center" |2017(7th)
|- style="background:#FAEB86"
|Top Of The Lake: China Girl|Foxtel/BBC First|Emile Sherman, Iain Canning, Jane Campion, Philippa Campbell, Libby Sharpe|-
|Cleverman
|ABC
|Rosemary Blight, Sharon Lark, Ryan Griffen, Jane Allen
|-
|Glitch
|ABC
|Louise Fox, Tony Ayres, Julie Eckersley, Chris Oliver-Taylor
|-
|Wentworth (season 5)
|Foxtel/Showcase
|Jo Porter and Pino Amenta
|-
|Janet King - Playing Advantage
|ABC
|Lisa Scott, Karl Zwicky, Greg Haddrick
|-
| rowspan=6 style="text-align:center" |2018(8th)
|- style="background:#FAEB86"
|Mystery Road|ABC
|David Jowsey, Greer Simpkin|-
|Jack Irish
|ABC
|Ian Collie, Matt Cameron, Andrew Knight
|-
|Rake
|ABC
|Ian Collie, Peter Duncan, Richard Roxburgh
|-
|Mr Inbetween
|Foxtel/Showcase
|Michele Bennett
|-
|Wentworth (season 6)
|Foxtel/Showcase
|Jo Porter and Pino Amenta
|-
| rowspan=6 style="text-align:center" |2019(9th)
|- style="background:#FAEB86"| rowspan="6" 
|Total Control|ABC
|Darren Dale, Miranda Dear, Rachel Griffiths|-
|Mr Inbetween
|Foxtel/Showcase
|Michele Bennett
|-
|Bloom
|Stan
|David Maher, David Taylor, Glen Dolman, Sue Seeary
|-
|Secret City: Under the Eagle
|Foxtel/Showcase
|Stephen Corvini, Penny Chapman, Matt Cameron, Penny Win
|-
|Wentworth (season 7)
|Foxtel/Showcase
|Jo Porter and Pino Amenta
|-
| rowspan="7" style="text-align:center" |2020(10th)
|- style="background:#FAEB86"| rowspan="6" 
|Mystery Road|ABC
|David Jowsey, Greer Simpkin (ABC)|-
| Bloom
|Stan
|David Maher, David Taylor, Glen Dolman, Sue Seeary
|-
|Doctor Doctor
|Nine Network
|Ian Collie, Ally Henville, Keith Thompson, Rodger Corser
|-
|Halifax: Retribution
|Nine Network
|Roger Simpson, Louisa Kors
|-
|The Heights 
|ABC
|Warren Clarke, Peta Astbury-Bulsara, Debbie Lee, Que Minh Luu
|-
|Wentworth
|Foxtel
|Jo Porter, Pino Amenta
|}

See also
AACTA Award for Best Television Comedy Series
AACTA Awards

 Notes A: In 1993, and then from 1995 to 2001, the award was split into two categories: Best Episode in a Television Drama, Series or Serial and Best Episode in a Television Drama Serial (the latter was changed to Best Episode in a Television Drama Series (Long) in 1998). This means that two awards were presented for both categories each year, bringing the total of awards presented to twenty-nine.  B: Awarded for Best Episode in a Television Drama, Series or Serial.C: Awarded for Best Episode in a Television Drama Serial (1993–1997). The category then changed to Best Episode in a Television Drama Series (Long) (1998–2001).D: Awarded for Best Episode in a Television Drama Series.E': The Damnation of Harvey McHugh and Heartland'' were joint winners for Best Episode in a Television Drama Series at the 1994 awards.

References
General

Specific

External links

Drama